Hemipepsis ustulata is a species of tarantula hawk wasp native to the Southwestern United States. Tarantula hawks are a large, conspicuous family of long-legged wasps that prey on tarantulas. They use their long legs to grapple with their prey before paralyzing them with a powerful sting. Their stings are ranked as some of the most painful in the insect world according to the Schmidt sting pain index. They are solitary, displaying lekking territorial behavior in their mating rituals.

Description and identification
H. ustulata generally has a matte black body with rust-orange wings. It is among the largest of Hymenoptera, growing up to 5 cm in length. It is difficult to distinguish Hemipepsis from its Pepsis relatives. However, Pepsis tend to be a more metallic black with a deep-blue striped patterning. Since their biology and appearance is so similar, the only reliable way to tell them apart is by their wing venation patterns.

Distribution and habitat
H. ustulata is common in the arid climate of Southwestern United States, ranging from California through Arizona, New Mexico, and Texas, and as far north as Nevada, Oklahoma, and Kansas. Much of the fieldwork done on H. ustulata was performed in the Sonoran Desert near Phoenix, Arizona, by John Alcock.  H. ustulata distribution overlaps with theraphosid spiders, which they parasitize to raise their young.

Life history

Parasitism
The tarantula hawk's namesake comes from its predation of tarantulas to raise their young. After mating, the female wasp seeks out a tarantula, either free-ranging or in its burrow. After grappling with the tarantula, the wasp delivers a powerful sting that paralyzes the tarantula but keeps it alive. This allows the wasp to lay an egg that adheres to the spider's abdomen. One tarantula is provisioned per egg. The egg is about 5 mm long, gently curved, and creamy white in color. The wasp then drags the paralyzed tarantula along with the egg, sometimes up to 100 m, to a cavity or burrow to be sealed. This dugout can be either dug by the wasp or be the burrow of the paralyzed spider. When the larva hatches, it feeds on the spider's guts to completion, keeping the spider alive for as long as possible for freshness.

Larva
About three days after the egg is laid, the free end of the egg becomes glassy white. The grub chews its way out with its tiny, dark-tipped mandibles. Eventually, the eggshell splits, revealing the glistening, white, footless grub. The grub, still attached to the host tarantula by its tail end, arches over and digs into the tarantula's skin, creating a perforation aided by a dissolving fluid. After the grub is firmly attached by both its tail and head to the tarantula, it begins to suck the juices out of the tarantula's body. As it feeds, the larva grows, rapidly engorging itself on the tarantula and darkening in color. As it grows, it molts several times, casting off its head capsule and exoskeleton. After each molt, it resumes feeding, often through a new perforation. By the fourth instar, the tarantula's abdomen has collapsed slightly. At the fifth and last instar, the larva has developed a pair of stout, three-toothed mandibles to keep up with its feeding habits. The larva becomes muscular and mobile by this stage. It cuts a hole into the tarantula's carapace and thrust its head and thorax inside the host spider, continuing to feed ravenously. As it feeds, it hollows out the tarantula, up to the bases of the spider's hairy legs.  At the beginning of this invasive assault, the tarantula finally expires. This entire process from egg to fifth instar takes around 35 days total.

Cocoon and pupa
The well-nourished grub begins to spin a delicate framework to support its cocoon. The Hemipepsis cocoon is a brown silk structure. It is slightly wider at the end from which the wasp will emerge. The inner wall is varnished, but no inner cocoon is seen.  Completion takes several hours, and at the end of it, the grub evacuates its alimentary canal; this meconium, or first stool, becomes a hardened mass at the end of the cocoon. The grub is much smaller than it was at the end of feeding because it has expended so much body content on spinning the cocoon and voiding its alimentary canal. The cocoon turns a greasy amber yellow from the original silky gray. The time of hatching is dependent on the season. A cocoon formed early in the summer may hatch the same summer, but a late summer or autumn brood may remain in cocoon form until the following spring or summer. Once the grub reaches the pupal stage, the grub lies extended and quiet. The head capsule splits along the midline, and a glassy, whitish pupa forces its way out of the discarded, shriveling larval skin. The pupa turns creamy yellow, with gray-blue, large compound eyes showing through the thin integument. One can also see the antenna, stubby wing pads, and back spines.

Emergence from the cocoon

As the enclosed wasp develops, the pupa darkens. A sharp scratching noise can be heard as the young wasp cuts its way out of the tough cocoon with its strong mandibles. The hatched cocoon contains the remains of the larval skin, pupal skin, and waste from the larval stage and the young wasp. The young wasp then digs its way out of the underground cell.

Behavior

Breeding
The breeding season of H. ustulata occurs over a two-and-a-half-month period. Individual males actively seek mates on mountain ridges for up to three weeks at a time. Many males live more than one month.

Communication
How these wasps communicate with each other is unknown, especially within the aggregates they form. However, the powerful residual odors, flight patterns, and flashy colors are all likely candidates for how they communicate with each other.

Lekking behavior

Males often pick palo verde trees as landmark territories. The most preferred territories tend to be located higher up the mountain ridges. During the male flight season, considerable turnover occurs in territorial ownership. The average duration of male residence is around 8 days. Ownership is contested through aerial combat. Larger males have the advantage, displacing smaller males from the preferred territories over the course of the mating season. Males occur in great abundance during mating season; females are rarely seen. The operational sex ratio during this time is highly skewed towards males. In some ways, H. ustulata’s mating system resembles lek polygyny. In hilltopping insects, the male defends territories. Females may visit the territories, but they only remain long enough to mate, not to nest or feed. In a lekking species, the male-defended territory does not contain incentive of resources for females, such as food, shelter, or attractive nesting sites. Other characteristics of H. ustulata’s lekking behavior include the existence of a mating arena, where males aggregate year after year, with each male protecting its own perch/display territory and receptive females mate selectively and upon the inspection of the territorial males.

Consistency in territorial landmark sites
The tarantula hawk wasp returns to the same prominent plants, namely palo verde trees (Cercidium microphyllum), year after year during mating season. The preference rankings of perennial territories in one mountain ridge area remain highly consistent from generation to generation. Indirect evidence shows that the stability of male preferences from year to year indicates that the access to females is related to the ability of acquiring high-ranking territories.

Size variation and its behavioral and evolutionary consequences
Oftentimes in the natural history of a species, large body size confers reproductive advantage. This raises the question in H. ustulata: Why do smaller wasps persist? Generation after generation, wide size variation exists among these tarantula hawks. Wasps do not grow after metamorphosis, so smaller animals are at a permanent disadvantage competing against their larger fellows. John Alcock's studies emphasize the importance of size variation in claiming desirable territories among male H. ustulata wasps. Female provisioning behavior may play a role in the maintenance of size variation in this species. In tarantula hawks, the size of the offspring is determined by the mother's decision on how much to invest in each offspring. The size of the tarantula captured by the mother wasp determines how big the larva will become when fully grown. The subduing of a larger tarantula requires a greater energy investment and poses a greater risk to the mother wasp. If the offspring is a large male, it would have to be twice as fit as a smaller male offspring to repay the investment of the mother wasp. Thus, in some cases, it may be advantageous for the mother wasp to produce many small, male offspring. This would enable them to enjoy the same level of fitness as a female, but with fewer, larger progeny.

Territorial defense
Territorial males of this species perch upon prominent vegetation at high elevation (1500 m or higher) and chase intruders away. No more than one individual occupies each territory for more than a few minutes. Every so often, the landowning male wasp makes short, regular flights out from his perch. Intruding visitors are common among this species, as males jockey for the best territory. On occasion, the intruder engages in aerial combat with the territory owner over possession of the perch, a tree or bush. The two males clash wings and spiral vertically upwards, engaging in an aerial contest for the territory.

Interactions with other species

Diet
H. ustulata larvae feed on tarantulas that are paralyzed and captured by the adult wasps. Adult wasps spend lengthy periods of time patrolling, actively searching for prey on the ground. Adult wasps feed on nectar, and they visit flowers and flowering plants during the day. Popular sources of nectar include milkweeds (Asclepias) and western soapberry trees (Sapindus saponaria).

Predators
The debilitating, painful sting of H. ustulata deters nearly all predators. No examples of amphibian, reptilian, or mammalian predation of adult tarantula hawks are known. The only documented examples of tarantula hawk predation are of kingbirds in Puerto Rico, discovered by a respected entomologist, Dr. Punzo, who observed two instances of roadrunners attacking grounded tarantula hawks. However, if those tarantula hawks were healthy at the time of attack, or if they were male or female, is not known. Instances of predation by roadrunners in the literature are rare at best, even on harmless males, which speaks to the defensive effectiveness and reputation of tarantula hawks in the animal kingdom.

Convergent evolution
Evidence suggests the convergent evolution in perching and patrolling site preferences of H. ustulata with other hilltopping insects of the Sonoran Desert. The high mountain ridges attract the males of various hilltopping insect species, including tarantula hawk wasps, various butterflies, and bot flies. Among these ridges, certain locations are much more likely to be occupied by territorial males. Additionally, these preferred territories appear to be stable from year to year, and different species appear to have similar preferences for available sites. Preferred territories tend to be large, visual targets, jutting high on mountain ridges. These observations were confirmed by a study using artificial landmarks. This similar ranking preference for territories suggests a widespread convergence among the capacity of hilltopping insects’ compound eyes in their perception of what constitutes a conspicuous landmark feature.

Defense

Body armor
The sclerites and leg spines are defensive adaptations. Their integumentary armor protects the wasp from harm.

Venom
The venom from H. ustulata's sting is able to paralyze prey for several months. The paralysis is not directly fatal, but victims will likely starve to death before the paralysis wears off. The sting of the tarantula hawk (Pepsis spp.) is described on Schmidt's insect pain index as “blinding, fierce, shockingly electric. Like a running hair dryer has just been dropped in your bubble bath." In humans, the pain usually subsides in 5 minutes.

Warning coloration and odor

H. ustulata and other members of Pepsini tarantula hawks have aposematic coloration. They range from black to blue-black with bright yellow, orange, or red wings. Tarantula hawks also emit an aposematic odor, which deters predators.

Mimicry
Tarantula hawks use convergent coloration for defense. Female tarantula hawks benefit from other females warding off potential predators wither their stings. Male tarantula hawks, which are stingless, benefit from their resemblance to females. Other species gain protection through both Müllerian and Batesian mimicry of tarantula hawks.

Aggregation
When resources are scarce, these wasps form aggregations for both defensive and foraging. The aggregations are a larger threat to potential predators than single wasps, making them effective at warding off threats to the wasp. Being part of a large group also reduces each individual's chance of being attacked. Apart from its defensive value, such aggregations are also observed to benefit by aiding the wasps in locating nectar and by increasing mating opportunities.

References

External links 
Hemipepsis photo gallery 
Schmidt Pain Index Video 
Tarantula Hawk Fighting Tarantula 

Hymenoptera of North America
Insects of the United States
Pepsinae
Insects described in 1843
Taxa named by Anders Gustaf Dahlbom